The Enemy Within: The Secret War Against the Miners is a book by British journalist and writer Seumas Milne, first published in 1994. Updated editions were released in 1995, 2004, and 2014.

Synopsis
The book investigates the circumstances surrounding the UK miners' strike (1984–1985) and the involvement of intelligence services in destroying the miners and the lengths the police, intelligence services and government went to in subverting public opinion.
Verso Books stated that "In this 30th anniversary edition new material brings the story up to date with further revelations about the secret war against organised labour and political dissent".

Reception
Owen Jones described the book as "A terrifying, frightening indictment of the British establishment" while Naomi Klein praised it as "The definitive account of the strike—the best book on the Thatcher era". In The Irish Times the book was commended as "A staggering journalistic investigation" with Joseph Crilly writing that "one can only allow one’s head to swirl with a sense of the iniquity and the dishonesty involved".
The book was also recommended by Red Pepper in which Huw Beynon described the book as a "classic" and wrote "Through Seamus Milne’s unique reporting into the dark side of the miners’ strike, we can find roots of the repression that Britain continues to struggle with".

References

1994 non-fiction books
2004 non-fiction books
2014 non-fiction books
Books by Seumas Milne
Books about politics of the United Kingdom
MI5
UK miners' strike (1984–1985)
Non-fiction books about espionage
Books about intelligence agencies
Books about media bias
Books about the media
Verso Books books